The 1900 United States presidential election in Idaho took place on November 6, 1900. All contemporary 45 states were part of the 1900 United States presidential election. State voters chose three electors to the Electoral College, which selected the president and vice president.

Idaho was won by the Democratic nominees, William Jennings Bryan of Nebraska and his running mate Adlai Stevenson I of Illinois. Bryan and Stevenson defeated the Republican nominees, William McKinley of Ohio and his running mate Theodore Roosevelt of New York.

Bryan had previously defeated McKinley in Idaho four years earlier. He would later lose the state to William Howard Taft in 1908. As of the 2020 election this is the last election in which the Republican candidate won the presidency without Idaho.

Results

Results by county

See also
 United States presidential elections in Idaho

Notes

References

Idaho
1900
1900 Idaho elections